Big Five Hlabisa Local Municipality is a local municipality of South Africa. It was established for the August 2016 local elections by the merging of The Big 5 False Bay and Hlabisa local municipalities.

Politics 

The municipal council consists of twenty-five members elected by mixed-member proportional representation. Thirteen councillors are elected by first-past-the-post voting in thirteen wards, while the remaining twelve are chosen from party lists so that the total number of party representatives is proportional to the number of votes received. In the election of 1 November 2021 the Inkatha Freedom Party (IFP) won a majority of fifteen seats on the council.

The following table shows the results of the election.

References

External links

Local municipalities of the Umkhanyakude District Municipality